Vacuolar protein sorting 53 homolog (S. cerevisiae) is a protein that in humans is encoded by the VPS53 gene.

Function 

This gene encodes a protein with sequence similarity to the yeast Vps53p protein. Vps53p is involved in retrograde vesicle trafficking in late Golgi. [provided by RefSeq, Jul 2008].

Mutations in VPS53 cause cerebello-cerebral atrophy type 2.

References

Further reading